, (1884–1962) was a Japanese naturalist in Chōsen (1910–1945). He taught at a preparatory school for Keijō Imperial University in Seoul from 1909 until he was expelled by the American forces in 1945.  Primarily an ichthyologist, he published numerous works on the zoology of the Korean Peninsula and Manchuria.  Some of these, such as his Checklist of the Fishes of Korea and the 1934 Coloured Butterflies from Korea, are still in print.

References
Austin, Oliver. 1948. The Birds of Korea. Bulletin of the Museum of Comparative Zoology at Harvard College 101 no. 1 
Vladykov, V. & Greeley, J. 1963. Order Acipenseroidei in Soft-rayed Bony fishes : class Osteichthyes, order Acipenseroidei, order Lepisostei, order Isospondyli, suborder Elopoidea, suborder Clupeoidea, suborder Salmonoidea. Fishes of the Western North Atlantic. Sears Foundation for Marine Research 

Japanese people of Korea under Japanese rule
Japanese biologists
1884 births
1962 deaths
20th-century biologists